Triazolium salts are chemical compounds based on the substituted triazole structural element. They are composed of a cation based on a heterocyclic five-membered ring with three nitrogen atoms, two of which are functionalized and a corresponding counterion (anion). Depending on the arrangement of the three nitrogen atoms the triazolium salts are divided into two isomers, namely 1,3,4-trisubstituted-1H-1,2,3-triazolium salts as well as 1,2,4-triazolium salts. They are precursors for the preparation of N-heterocylcic carbenes.

1,3,4-trisubstituted-1H-1,2,3-triazolium salts

1,4-disubstituted 1,2,4-triazolium salts

References

Chemistry
Chemical compounds
Organic compounds
Heterocyclic compounds